"Only the Loot Can Make Me Happy" is a song performed by R&B musician R. Kelly and Poke & Tone from Trackmasters Entertainment. The song was written and produced by R. Kelly and the Trackmasters. The song heavily samples the 1987 Surface's song "Happy".

It was released as a single in the UK on May 23, 2000, and peaked at number 24 in the UK Singles Chart.

Charts

References 

1998 songs
2000 singles
Jive Records singles
R. Kelly songs
Songs written by R. Kelly
Song recordings produced by R. Kelly
Songs written by Samuel Barnes (songwriter)
Songs written by Jean-Claude Olivier
Song recordings produced by Trackmasters
Songs written by David Conley (musician)
Hip hop soul songs